Eastwood is an unincorporated community in Brown County, in the U.S. state of Ohio.

History
A post office called Eastwood was established in 1876, and remained in operation until 1935.  The former railroad depot there was called Salem Station.

References

Unincorporated communities in Brown County, Ohio
1876 establishments in Ohio
Populated places established in 1876
Unincorporated communities in Ohio